The 2008 ACB Playoffs was the final phase of the 2007-2008 ACB season. It started on Thursday, May 15, 2008, and ran until Tuesday, June 3, 2008.

A change in the schedule was introduced in this season: Quarterfinals and Semifinals series were 3-match rounds instead of the 5-match rounds used in the previous years. This modification had apparently revealed to be quite significant, since the first (Real Madrid) and the second (DKV Joventut) classifieds of the Regular Season were surprisingly out earlier than it was expected.

Final series brought face to face TAU Cerámica and AXA FC Barcelona for the first time in ACB history (although, curiously, there has always been one of these two teams separately in a Final since the 1993–94 season).

TAU Cerámica won the Final series by 3-0 and obtained their second ACB championship.

Playoff seedings, results, and schedules

Quarterfinals
The quarterfinals were best-of-3 series.

Real Madrid vs. Unicaja Málaga

Unicaja Málaga win the series 2-0

DKV Joventut vs. Akasvayu Girona

DKV Joventut win the series 2-1

AXA FC Barcelona vs. iurbentia Bilbao

AXA FC Barcelona win the series 2-0

TAU Cerámica vs. Pamesa Valencia

TAU Ceramica win the series 2-1

Semifinals
The semifinals were best-of-3 series.

TAU Cerámica vs. Unicaja Málaga

TAU Cerámica win the series 2-0

DKV Joventut vs. AXA FC Barcelona

AXA FC Barcelona win the series 2-0

ACB finals
The finals were best-of-5 series.

AXA FC Barcelona vs. TAU Cerámica

TAU Cerámica win the series 3-0

External links 
 Official schedule and results

Liga ACB playoffs
Playoffs